Finale is a 2009 horror film directed by John Michael Elfers and starring Carolyn von Hauck. Inspired by actual events from the director's life, FINALE is reminiscent of Suspiria, Hellraiser and Rosemary's Baby, shot in super 16mm to capture an authentic 1970s feel, with all practical in-camera effects, borrowed from the lost arts of early film magicians.

The film was released in the United States on May 25, 2010, after premiering at A Night of Horror in Sydney Australia, and Screamfest in the U.S. in 2009.

Plot
A mother descends into madness after the apparent suicide of her eldest son. The bizarre circumstances surrounding his death cause the mother, Helen, to believe that much darker, sinister forces were behind the death of her son. But when Helen's investigation threatens to destroy her sanity in addition to her daughter's life, she realises that the only exit from the nightmare is the very route attempted by her dead son.

Cast
 Carolyn von Hauck as Helen Michaels
 Suthi Picotte as Kathryn Michaels

Reception

The film received positive reviews from LA Weekly, Arrow in the Head, and Digital Retribution.

Awards
 "Independent Spirit Award" the A Night of Horror film festival of Sydney, Australia

References

External links
 
 
 

2009 films
2009 horror films
Films set in Ohio
American independent films
Films shot in 16 mm film
2000s English-language films
2000s American films